Coleophora lutatiella is a moth of the family Coleophoridae. It is found in Spain.

References

lutatiella
Moths described in 1859
Moths of Europe